Red Sorghum may refer to:

 Red Sorghum (novel), a 1986 Chinese novel by Mo Yan
 Red Sorghum (film), a 1987 Chinese film based on Mo Yan's novel
 Red Sorghum (TV series), a 2014 Chinese TV series based on Mo Yan's novel
 Sorghum bicolor, a grass usually cultivated for food